O'Neill is originally a Californian surf wear and surfboard brand started in 1952 by Jack O'Neill. It moved down the coast from San Francisco to Santa Cruz by the end of the decade. Jack is credited to have invented the wetsuit, his son Pat the leash on the surfboard. The company logo symbolizes a breaking surf wave. "O'NEILL" and the "Wave logo" are trademarks registered worldwide.

In May 2007 the ownership of the brand was sold to a privately held company headquartered in Luxembourg. The company produces wetsuits, performance water and snow sports inspired apparel for young adults, and lifestyle apparel. The products are distributed to 86 countries worldwide, some by licensed distributors. In the United States, the O'Neill clothing license is held by the La Jolla Group. The O'Neill wetsuit business continues to be owned by the O'Neill family and is based in Santa Cruz, CA.

In 1996 O'Neill set up the O'Neill Sea Odyssey, a free, ocean-based program to educate young people about the marine environment. Over 100,000 children have participated in this program.  O'Neill is involved in various other causes to help support the environment, such as through O'Neill Blue  brand and marketing efforts to help promote O'Neill's mission to protect our oceans for generations to come, and minimize the impact on our planet.

O'Neill operates from headquarters in Grand Duchy of Luxembourg and has satellite offices in The Netherlands, the USA, Canada, Australia, Chile, Korea, etc.

O'Neill sponsors young promising as well as high-profile surfers, boarders and skiers, as part of their ambassador program.

Company Founder Jack O'Neill died on 2 June 2017, aged 94.

References

External links
 Official Site
 O'Neill Sea Odyssey

Sportswear brands
Companies based in Santa Cruz County, California
Clothing companies of the United States
Swimwear manufacturers
Surfwear brands
Clothing companies established in 1952
1952 establishments in California